The Ferrari Club of America is a U.S.-based organization for owners and enthusiasts of Ferrari-built sports cars. The club has 34 chapters spread across 16 regions in the U.S. and Canada.

The club hosts a number of social, technical and driving education-related events, including HPDEs and an Annual Meet.

External links
Official site

Ferrari
Automobile associations in the United States